Museville may refer to:

 Museville, Ohio, an unincorporated community in Muskingum County
 Museville, Virginia, an unincorporated community in Pittsylvania County